Destination is South Korean boy band SS501's eight Korean mini-album released on May 24, 2010 by DSP Media. This was also their last mini-album before their contract's expiration.

After wrapping up their 1st Asia Tour Persona, SS501 made preparations for their new mini-album Destination right away. Once again, they collaborated with American producers Steven Lee and Ken Lewis who worked on their Rebirth album, as well as Grammy-winning mix engineer Kevin KD Davis, producing another world-class pop album with four new songs.

The lead track, "Love Ya" was composed by Steven Lee, a grand and emotional mid-tempo song with heavy beats, accompanied by an orchestra and blended with a piano melody. The album also features the R&B track "Let Me Be The One", the dance song "Crazy 4 U" which was first heard and performed during their tour, and the Eurobeat-style pop track "Forever" written by Heo Young-saeng.

Their first win for the lead track, "Love Ya", was on KBS's Music Bank, on June 11. On June 18, DSP announced that SS501 would end their "Love Ya" promotions due to the expiration of their contract on June 7, 2010, five years after since their debut.

Track listing

Music videos
 "Love Ya"
 "Let Me Be The One"

Release history

Charts

References

External links

 
 

SS501 albums
2010 EPs